Väinö Tiihonen (28 November 1912 – 27 July 1957) was a Finnish ski jumper. He competed in the individual event at the 1936 Winter Olympics.

References

1912 births
1957 deaths
Finnish male ski jumpers
Olympic ski jumpers of Finland
Ski jumpers at the 1936 Winter Olympics
Sportspeople from Helsinki
20th-century Finnish people